Play it by Ear Productions was an audio theatre production company devoted to the development and distribution of original plays for radio, the internet, and compact disc; the company was founded in 2002 by actor/playwright/producer Lance Roger Axt in New York City, New York. From July 1, 2003 - December 31, 2010, Play it by Ear Productions was based on the Central Coast of California.

Production history
In 2003, Axt produced the first series of Play it by Ear pieces as part of the anthology series We Have Ignition. We Have Ignition is a new works program in which original one-act plays for audio are commissioned from emerging and mid-career playwrights who are more accustomed to writing plays for the stage. In writing for audio, these writers are given the unique opportunity to flex their skills in a different artistic medium, while finding greater exposure to their work. The plays were recorded at SueMedia Studios on Long Island, New York from the months of February to May, 2003. They were:

The Field, written by Elizabeth Benjamin, and directed by Lizzie Gottlieb and Nathan Dean: Glenn Kessler and Keira Naughton portray a couple in their newly purchased farmhouse; a tribe of Native Americans are unearthing tribal remains stemming from a massacre that took place on the land in the 1800s. A series of bizarre episodes have occurred in the farmhouse since the beginning of the ritual digging, and it takes a representative (portrayed by James Fall) to help the two make sense of it all.

The Field was the winner of the 2003 Gold Ogle Award for Best Fantasy/Horror/Mystery Audio Production of the Year presented by the American Society for Science Fiction Audio and the Minnesota Society for Interest in Science Fiction and Fantasy.

Matthew, Mark, Luke, and Chaz, written and directed by Robert Grady. Chip Gudger, Axt, Matthew Mullin, and Grady play the respective roles in this original comedy detailing why there are four versions of Jesus' life story: no one can get along! Matthew is anal retentive, Mark and Luke are slow-witted gossips and John has spent most of his energy and time with a magistrate changing his name to Chaz so as not to be confused with John the Baptist.

The Love Song Of..., written by Lynn Rosen and directed by Eileen Myers. Polly Adams and Jen Albano are a mother and daughter waiting in the rain by Columbia University for their father to pick up for their Grandmother's birthday party. While wondering where Dad is, or if he will even come, the two make discoveries about the other that they never knew before.

David Shinn was the sound designer, while live sound effects were designed and performed by Sue Zizza.  All three plays in the "We Have Ignition: 2003" series premiered in the months of June and July 2003 on WNYE FM in New York City. Individual pieces have since aired on KPFA FM  (servicing the San Francisco Bay Area), KFAI FM (St. Paul, Minnesota), and KUNM FM (New Mexico). All three pieces were part of the nationally syndicated series "The Radio Works." Recorded in 2009 was Turn to Stone by Steve Tesher, a comedy-drama offering a different take on the origins of the first shot fired in the American Civil War.

In 2010 Axt ended Play it by Ear Productions to focus on his audio production company with William Dufris and Elaine Lee, AudioComics, also known as The AudioComics Company.

Play it by Ear Live
In January 2005, Axt produced, directed, performed in, and did the foley effects for a live production of the legendary audio essay We Hold These Truths by Norman Corwin at the Canterbury Woods Auditorium in Pacific Grove, California as a benefit to help pay for production costs on "Turn to Stone." This presentation featured as many as 18 local actors. The show was produced with permission from Corwin, with the company of actors working from the script from the 50th Anniversary production. In 2006, Axt began presenting a series of shows re-creating shows from the golden age of radio called "Those Thrilling Days of Yesteryear." In 2008, a second live performance series started called "A Signal to Noise" which presents contemporary/modern plays, little known classics, and dark fantasies as audio theatre-style readings, beginning with Ron Sossi and Frank Condon's The Chicago Conspiracy Trial three weeks before the 2008 Presidential Election, and followed by Starstruck by Elaine Lee in 2009.

Education
Play it by Ear Productions also brought the art of audio drama to the next generation of performers in the Monterey/Carmel area with a series of workshops for children and pre-teens, first at the Children's Experimental Theatre of Carmel from 2004 to 2006, then at the School of Dramatic Arts at Pacific Repertory Theatre from 2006 to 2008 and the International School of Monterey in 2007.

Radio production companies